Saheb Ettabaâ Palace is an old palace in the Medina of Tunis.

Localization 
It is located in south-west of the Halfaouine square.

History 
Youssef Saheb Ettabaa ordered this palace to be built at the beginning of the 19th century.

In the same period, the whole Halfaouine district witnessed many modifications: A new mosque (Saheb Ettabaâ Mosque), two madrasas, a hammam, souk Jedid, a fountain (sabil), a mausoleum (Tourba) and a foundouk were built there.

Architecture 
The palace can be found at the entrance of Souk Jedid.
It has 3 floors: The ground floor was used for the stables and warehouses while the two remaining floors were for the private apartments and salons.

References 

History of Tunis
Palaces in the medina of Tunis